Patric Pfeiffer (born 20 August 1999) is a German professional footballer who plays as a defender for SV Darmstadt 98.

Early life
Pfeiffer was born in Hamburg. He is of Ghanaian descent.

Club career
In the summer of 2019, Pfeiffer joined SV Darmstadt 98 from Hamburger SV.

International career
Being born in Germany, but also having Ghanaian origins, Pfeiffer has been able to choose to represent either the countries internationally.

In July 2022, the president of the Ghana FA, Kurt Okraku, announced that Pfeiffer was one of the few players that had officially switched allegiances to represent the Ghanaian senior national team internationally.

References

External links
 

Living people
1999 births
German sportspeople of Ghanaian descent
Footballers from Hamburg
Association football defenders
German footballers
Hamburger SV II players
Hamburger SV players
SV Darmstadt 98 players
2. Bundesliga players
Regionalliga players